Mike McKee (born 12 August 1993) is a New Zealand rugby union player who plays for Moana Pasifika in Super Rugby and  in the National Provincial Championship (NPC). His playing position is lock. McKee is of Cook Islands descent.

Early life
McKee hails from Waikaia in Southland. He attended Otago Boys' High School in Dunedin.

Rugby career
He would make 20 appearances for the Southland Stags between 2015 and 2017. McKee would score his first try for the Stags on 7 October 2017 against .

McKee returned to the Stags in 2019. He made 9 appearances that year and 8 in 2020.

McKee made a move to Spain to play for Ciencias Sevilla CR during the 2019–20 División de Honor de Rugby season. He scored 3 tries in 9 appearances.

On 25 October 2021 McKee was announced as having signed for Moana Pasifika ahead of the 2022 Super Rugby Pacific season.

Personal life
McKee is of Cook Islands descent. McKee is the fourth member of his family to play for Southland. His grandfather Bill, uncle David, and cousin Scott all played for the Stags.

Reference list

External links
Itsrugby.co.uk profile

New Zealand rugby union players
Living people
Rugby union locks
Southland rugby union players
Counties Manukau rugby union players
Moana Pasifika players
People educated at Otago Boys' High School
1993 births
Cook Island rugby union players
Ciencias Sevilla CR players
Rugby union players from Southland, New Zealand